A.F.C.A (or just AFCA) is a Dutch hooligan firm linked to A.F.C. Ajax. In the past the Ajax fans consists only out of one firm: the well known F-side. Nowadays there are more firms active such as VAK410. Although they are separated groups, there is cooperation between them. This is especially the case during riots, the AFCA firm then consists of a mix with members from all of the groups, and they operate as one firm: the AFCA firm.

Main groups 
The main groups within the AFCA hooligan firm are:
 Oude Garde (Old school members from Vak-F)
 F-side
 Vak M (founded as a sub-group from the F-side, now probably the group with the most influence due to their reputation)
 ULTRAS AmsterdamVAK410
 AFCA Maluku
 Amsterdam Hooligans 3th/AFCA Youth (3th generation)
 Amsterdam Hooligans 4th (4th generation)
 Amsterdam Hooligans 5th (5th generation)
 Perry Boys

Notes 
 In the media the AFCA Supportersclub is often wrongly accused of being the same as the AFCA Hooligans. The AFCA supporters club is in no way connected with the AFCA Hooligans other than their love for Ajax.
 The A.F.C.A (clothing) was founded as clothing especially for the hardcore (hooligan) element of the Ajax supporters. Nowadays regular fans wear the same clothing.

Young 020 new firm from Amsterdam

References

AFC Ajax
Association football hooligan firms
Gangs in the Netherlands